This article includes a list of countries of the world sorted by their Gross National Income (GNI) per capita at purchasing power parity (PPP).  For rankings regarding wealth, see list of countries by wealth per adult.

List

See also
List of countries by GNI (nominal) per capita
World Bank high-income economy
List of sovereign states in Europe by GNI (PPP) per capita

References

.GNI (PPP) per capita
GNI (PPP) per capita